Carl Raubenheimer (born 19 December 1983) is a South African cricketer. He is a right-handed batsman and leg-break bowler who plays for Boland. He was born in Pretoria.

Raubenheimer made his first-class debut during the 2009–10 season, against Griqualand West. From the tailend, he scored 2 runs in the first innings in which he batted.

References

External links
Carl Raubenheimer at Cricinfo

1983 births
Living people
South African cricketers
Boland cricketers